Eleonore Stiasny also known as Nora Stiasny née Zuckerkandl (December 16, 1898 – 1942) was an Austrian Jewish art collector murdered in the Holocaust.

Early life 
Stiasny was born on December 16, 1898, in Vienna to Otto and Amalie Zuckerkandl who was famously portrayed by Gustav Klimt, and was the niece of the great collectors Viktor and Paula Zuckerkandl.

Nazi era 
She was forced to sell a painting by Klimt, entitled Apple Tree, a few months after Austria's Anschluss with Nazi Germany, and was later deported by Nazis and murdered in 1942 with her mother, her husband and son.

Restitution claims 
In 2000, the restitution commission advised the return of Klimt's Apple Trees II, hanging in the Belvedere Museum, to the heirs of Nora Stiasny.

In 2021 France restituted the Klimt Rose Bushes Under Trees ("Rosiers sous les arbres") which had hung in the Musée d'Orsay to the Stiasny heirs.

See also 

 The Holocaust in Austria
 List of claims for restitution of Nazi-looted art

References 

Subjects of Nazi art appropriations
Jewish art collectors
Women art collectors
1898 births
1942 deaths
Austrian Jews who died in the Holocaust